Ghim is a surname and given name. Notable people with this name include:

 Doug Ghim, American golf player
 Ghim Kumari Gurung, Nepalese football player
 Yeap Ghim Guan (1941–2007), Malaysian politician
 Yeoh Ghim Seng (1918–1993), Singaporean politician